Douglas Cooper may refer to:
 Douglas Cooper (art historian) (1911–1984), British art historian and collector
 Douglas Anthony Cooper (born 1960), Canadian writer
 Douglas H. Cooper (1815–1879), American Civil War Confederate general
 Douglas Percival Cooper (1875–1950), British cinematographer
 Doug Cooper (racing driver) (1938–1987), American NASCAR driver
 Doug Cooper (author) (born 1970), American writer of literary fiction